Michael Stich defeated the defending champion Goran Ivanišević in the final, 4–6, 7–6(8–6), 7–6(7–3), 6–2 to win the singles tennis title at the 1993 Stockholm Open.

Seeds

  Pete Sampras (second round)
  Jim Courier (third round)
  Boris Becker (third round)
  Michael Stich (champion)
  Sergi Bruguera (third round)
  Stefan Edberg (quarterfinals)
  Andrei Medvedev (second round)
  Goran Ivanišević (final)
  Petr Korda (quarterfinals)
  Todd Martin (third round)
  Karel Nováček (withdrew)
  Alexander Volkov (second round)
  Magnus Gustafsson (third round)
  Wayne Ferreira (second round)
  Marc Rosset (semifinals)
  Arnaud Boetsch (quarterfinals)

Draw

Finals

Top half

Section 1

Section 2

Bottom half

Section 3

Section 4

External links
 1993 Stockholm Open draw

Singles